Live in Texas  may refer to:

Live in Texas (Linkin Park album), a 2003 CD & DVD album by Linkin Park
Live in Texas (Lyle Lovett album), a 1999 album by Lyle Lovett
Live in Texas (Vince Bell album), a 2001 album by Vince Bell

See also
Live in Texas: Dead Armadillos, a 1981 album by Trapeze